This Is Football 2004, known as World Tour Soccer 2005 in North America, is a sports video game developed by London Studio and published by Sony Computer Entertainment in Europe and 989 Sports in North America exclusively for PlayStation 2.

Reception

This is Football 2004 received "mixed or average" reviews, according to review aggregator Metacritic.

References

External links

2004 video games
Association football video games
Multiplayer and single-player video games
PlayStation 2 games
PlayStation 2-only games
Sony Interactive Entertainment games
This Is Football
Video games developed in the United Kingdom
London Studio games